The Central District of Mehrestan County, formerly known as the Central District of Zaboli County, is a district (bakhsh) in Mehrestan County, Sistan and Baluchestan province, Iran. In 2011, the name of the county changed to Mehrestan. At the 2006 census, its population was 31,679, in 6,872 families. The district has one city: Zaboli. The district has two rural districts (dehestan): Birk Rural District and Zaboli Rural District.

References 

Mehrestan County
Districts of Sistan and Baluchestan Province